Millwood is an unincorporated community located in Clarke County, Virginia, United States. Millwood is the home of many of Clarke County's most historic sites including the Burwell-Morgan Mill (1785), Carter Hall (1792), the Greenway Historic District, Long Branch (1811), Old Chapel (1790), and the River House. Project HOPE is based at Carter Hall.

History

Listed on the National Register of Historic Places.
Burwell-Morgan Mill
Carter Hall 
Long Branch Plantation
Millwood Commercial Historic District
Old Chapel 
River House

References

External links 

Small Towns of Virginia Series: Millwood
Carter Hall Conference Center
Long Branch Farm
Historic Millwood Photographs

Unincorporated communities in Clarke County, Virginia
Unincorporated communities in Virginia